Robert Palmer Dilworth (December 2, 1914 – October 29, 1993) was an American mathematician. His primary research area was lattice theory; his biography at the MacTutor History of Mathematics archive states "it would not be an exaggeration to say that he was one of the main factors in the subject moving from being merely a tool of other disciplines to an important subject in its own right". He is best known for Dilworth's theorem  relating chains and antichains in partial orders; he was also the first to study antimatroids .

Dilworth was born in 1914 in Hemet, California, at that time a remote desert ranching town. He went to college at the California Institute of Technology, receiving his baccalaureate in 1936 and continuing there for his graduate studies. Dilworth's graduate advisor was Morgan Ward, a student of Eric Temple Bell, who was also on the Caltech faculty at the time. On receiving his Ph.D. in 1939, Dilworth took an instructorship at Yale University. While at Yale, he met and married his wife, Miriam White, with whom he eventually had two sons. He returned to Caltech as a faculty member in 1943, and spent the remainder of his academic career there. 
Dilworth advised 17 Ph.D. students and  has 635 academic descendants listed at the Mathematics Genealogy Project, many through his student Juris Hartmanis, a noted complexity theorist. Other notable mathematicians advised by Dilworth include Curtis Greene and Alfred W. Hales.

Selected bibliography 
.
.
.
.
.

References and external links 
.

.

20th-century American mathematicians
Lattice theorists
1914 births
1993 deaths
California Institute of Technology alumni
California Institute of Technology faculty
Yale University faculty
People from Hemet, California
Mathematicians from California